There have been seven Baronetcies created for persons with the surname Lewis, two in the Baronetage of England and five in the Baronetage of the United Kingdom. Only one creation is extant as of 2010.

Lewis baronets, of Llangorse (1628)
The Lewis Baronetcy, of Llanghorse in the County of Brecon, was created in the Baronetage of England on 14 September 1628 for William Lewis, member of parliament for Petersfield, Breconshire and Lymington. The title became extinct on his death in 1677.
Sir William Lewis, 1st Baronet (1598–1677)

Lewis baronets, of Ledstone (1660)

The Lewis Baronetcy, of Ledstone, was created in the Baronetage of England on 15 October 1660 for John Lewis. The title became extinct on his death in 1671.
Sir John Lewis, 1st Baronet (–1671)

Lewis baronets, of Harpton Court (1846)
The Lewis Baronetcy, of Harpton Court in the County of Radnor, was created in the Baronetage of the United Kingdom on 11 July 1846 for the politician Thomas Frankland Lewis. His son, the second Baronet, was a distinguished statesman who served as both Chancellor of the Exchequer and Home Secretary. The title became extinct on the death of the fourth Baronet in 1911.
Sir Thomas Frankland Lewis, 1st Baronet (1780–1855)
Sir George Cornewall Lewis, 2nd Baronet (1806–1863)
Sir Gilbert Frankland Lewis, 3rd Baronet (1808–1883)
Sir Herbert Edmund Frankland Lewis, 4th Baronet (1846–1911)

Lewis baronets, of Brighton (1887)
The Lewis Baronetcy, of Brighton in the County of Sussex, was created in the Baronetage of the United Kingdom on 6 April 1887 for Charles Lewis, Member of Parliament for Antrim North. The title became extinct on his death in 1893.
Sir Charles Edward Lewis, 1st Baronet (1825–1893)

Lewis baronets, of Nantgwyne (1896)
The Lewis Baronetcy, of Nantgwyne in the County of Glamorgan, was created in the Baronetage of the United Kingdom on 15 February 1896. For more information on this creation, see Baron Merthyr.

Lewis baronets, of Portland Place and The Danish Pavilion (1902)
The Lewis Baronetcy, of Portland Place in Marylebone in the County of London and of The Danish Pavilion in Overstrand in the County of Norfolk, was created in the Baronetage of the United Kingdom on 24 July 1902 for the lawyer Sir George Lewis. The title became extinct when the third Baronet was killed in action in 1945.
Sir George Henry Lewis, 1st Baronet (1835–1911)
Sir George James Graham Lewis, 2nd Baronet (1868–1927)
Sir George James Ernest Lewis, 3rd Baronet (1910–1945)

Lewis baronets, of Essendon Place (1918)
The Lewis Baronetcy, of Essendon Place in the County of Hertford, was created in the Baronetage of the United Kingdom on 11 February 1918. For more information on this creation, see Baron Essendon.

Notes

References
Kidd, Charles, Williamson, David (editors). Debrett's Peerage and Baronetage (1990 edition). New York: St Martin's Press, 1990, 

Baronetcies in the Baronetage of the United Kingdom
Extinct baronetcies in the Baronetage of England
Extinct baronetcies in the Baronetage of the United Kingdom
1628 establishments in England